Democratic Underground is an online community for members of the United States Democratic Party.  Its membership is restricted by policy to those who are supportive of the Democratic Party and Democratic candidates for political office.

History 

On Election Day 2016, the forum was hacked by unknown parties who replaced posts with pro-Trump messages like "God Emperor" and a video that contained the Statue of Liberty singing "Hold Back the Night" by the Protomen and a meme showing then-Republican Presidential Nominee Donald Trump pointing a gun at the viewer while using the homophobic slur faggot and saying "We're Making America Great Again."

Criticism
Discussions from posters at DU have drawn criticism.  One example of this was the dialog about the 2004 tsunami disaster, in which a few posts explored the possibility of "earthquake weapons". The posts were reported on by The New York Times and Fox News. An administrator also sent a letter to the Times, which was printed.

The site also saw criticism when, in 2003, a poster explained why they wished to see continued bloodshed in Iraq.

Copyright infringement lawsuit

In 2010, Democratic Underground was sued for alleged copyright infringement in a member's posting of a few paragraphs from an article in the Las Vegas Review-Journal.  The suit was brought by Righthaven, an entity that finds Review-Journal quotations online, buys the copyright for that story from the newspaper, and retroactively sues for copyright infringement. In response to the lawsuit, DU asserted that the quoted excerpt (five sentences of a 54-sentence article) was fair use, and counterclaimed against Righthaven for fraud, barratry, and champerty. DU is being represented in the case pro bono by the Electronic Frontier Foundation, attorneys from the firm of Winston & Strawn, and Las Vegas attorney Chad Bowers. After Righthaven lost a similar suit against Realty One Group over 8 of 30 sentences quoted from a news article, Righthaven asked the judge in the case against Democratic Underground to dismiss Righthaven's claim against DU.

On June 14, 2011, Judge Roger L. Hunt ruled that Righthaven be dismissed from the case because Righthaven had never owned the copyright of the article and gave Righthaven two weeks to explain in writing why it should not be sanctioned.

References

External links
 Democratic Underground homepage
Democratic Underground on Facebook
Democratic Underground on Twitter

Internet properties established in 2001
Political Internet forums
American political blogs